Sharon Lee Cripps (born 29 June 1977 in Brisbane, Queensland) is a former track and field sprinter from Australia. She attended Ferny Grove State High School in Brisbane.

Athletics career
Cripps represented Australia in two Summer Olympics (1996 and 2000)  and two Commonwealth Games (1998 and 2002), as well as the 2003 World Championships.

At the 1996 Olympics, as a 19-year-old, she made the final of the women's 4 x 100 metres relay, finishing seventh.  She was part of the Australian team that won the gold medal in the women's 4 × 100 metres relay at the 1998 Commonwealth Games along with Tania Van Heer, Lauren Hewitt and Nova Peris-Kneebone in a time of 43.39 seconds.  At the 2002 Commonwealth Games she made the final of both the 200 metres and 4 × 100 metres relay, finishing seventh and fourth respectively.  In 2003, she was Australia's national champion in the women's 100 and 200 metres.

Personal bests

References

External links
 
 
 
 
 

1977 births
Living people
Australian female sprinters
Athletes (track and field) at the 1996 Summer Olympics
Athletes (track and field) at the 2000 Summer Olympics
Athletes (track and field) at the 1998 Commonwealth Games
Athletes (track and field) at the 2002 Commonwealth Games
Olympic athletes of Australia
Commonwealth Games medallists in athletics
Commonwealth Games gold medallists for Australia
Athletes from Brisbane
World Athletics Championships athletes for Australia
Olympic female sprinters
Medallists at the 1998 Commonwealth Games